Takifugu radiatus is a species of pufferfish in the family Tetraodontidae. It is native to the Northwest Pacific, where it ranges from Kyushu to the East China Sea. It is a demersal species that reaches 20 cm (7.9 inches) SL.

References 

radiatus
Fish described in 1947